The 1993 Volkswagen Card Cup was a women's tennis tournament played on indoor carpet courts at the Messehalle 7 in Leipzig in Germany that was part of the Tier II category of the 1993 WTA Tour. It was the fourth edition of the tournament and was held from 27 September until 3 October 1993. First-seeded Steffi Graf won the singles title, her fourth consecutive at the event, and earned $75,000 first-prize money as well as 300 ranking points.

Finals

Singles
 Steffi Graf defeated  Jana Novotná 6–2, 6–0
 It was Graf's 9th singles title of the year and the 78th of her career.

Doubles
 Gigi Fernández /  Natasha Zvereva defeated  Jana Novotná /  Larisa Savchenko 6–3, 6–2
 It was Fernández' 10th doubles title of the year and the 41st of her career. It was Zvereva's 9th doubles title of the year and the 37th of her career.

References

External links
 ITF tournament edition details
 Tournament draws

Sparkassen Cup
Sparkassen Cup (tennis)
1993 in German tennis